Brigadier Collen Edward Melville Richards,  (1888–1971) was a senior officer in the British Army who served during the First and Second World Wars.

Joining the East Lancashire Regiment in 1911, Richards served during the First World War and was awarded the Military Cross in 1916 and the Distinguished Service Order in 1919. For his "good services" during the Aliab Dinka Uprising of 1919–20, Richards was appointed an Officer of the Order of the Nile by the Sultan of Egypt. In the Second World War, he commanded the 24th Gold Coast Brigade (12th African Division) during the East African Campaign and was appointed a Commander of the Order of the British Empire in the 1944 Birthday Honours. Richards retired from the army on 2 February 1946.

Command history
 Gold Coast Regiment – 1939
 4th Gold Coast Brigade, West Africa and East Africa – 1939 to 1940
 Royal West African Frontier Force – 1939 to 1942
 24th (Gold Coast) Brigade, East Africa – 1940 to 1941
 24th Gold Coast Brigade, East Africa and South Africa – 1941
 2nd (West Africa) Brigade, West Africa – 1941 to 1942
 5th West African Brigade, West Africa – 1942

References

1888 births
1971 deaths
British Army brigadiers of World War II
British Army personnel of World War I
Commanders of the Order of the British Empire
Companions of the Distinguished Service Order
East Lancashire Regiment officers
Recipients of the Military Cross
Royal West African Frontier Force officers